Fara'ata was a Palestinian village in the Qalqilya Governorate in the Western area of the West Bank, located 16 kilometers Southwest of Nablus. According to the Palestinian Central Bureau of Statistics, the village had a population of approximately 657 inhabitants in 2006.

In 2012 Fara'ata was merged with the larger Immatain village council.

Location
They are  bordered by Tell  to the east, Deir Istiya  to the south, Jinsafut, Al Funduq and Hajjah to the west, and Kafr Qaddum and Jit to the north.

History
Byzantine ceramics have been found in the village.

Fara'ata was noted in the Samaritan Chronicle (from the 12th century) under the name of Ophrah, while it has been known under its present name since the 14th century.

Ottoman era
Fara'ata was incorporated into the Ottoman Empire in 1517 with all of Palestine, and in 1596 it  appeared in the   tax registers  as Fara'ta, being in the Nahiya of Jabal Qubal of the Liwa of Nablus.  It had a population of 12 households and 6 bachelor, all Muslim. The villagers paid a fixed tax rate of 33,3% on a number of crops,  including wheat, barley, summer crops, olive trees,  goats and beehives, in addition to occasional revenues, a press for olive oil or grape syrup, and a fixed tax for people of Nablus area; a total of 4,500  Akçe.

In 1838, Fer'ata was noted as  located in Jurat Merda, south of Nablus.

In 1870 the French explorer Victor Guérin visited Fara'ata,  which he described having  "a very small number" of people, with some cisterns and remains of a stone sarcophagus as remnants of former history.

In the PEF's Survey of Western Palestine (SWP)  (1882), Fara'ata was  described as a "small village of ancient appearance, standing on a [..]  mound, with a rock-cut tomb to the south, and a sacred Mukam to the east."

British Mandate era
In the 1922 census of Palestine conducted  by the British Mandate authorities, Far'ata had a population of 36,  all Muslim, increasing in the  1931 census  to of 47 Muslims, in a total of 11 houses.

In the 1945 statistics the population of Far'ata was 70  Muslims,  while the total land area was 1,664  dunams, according to an official land and population survey. Of  this,  56 were allocated  for plantations and irrigable land, 961 for cereals,  while 10 dunams were classified as built-up areas.

Jordanian era

In the wake of the 1948 Arab–Israeli War, and after the 1949 Armistice Agreements, Fara'ata came under Jordanian rule.

The Jordanian census of 1961 found 317 inhabitants in  Fara'ata.

Post-1967
Since the Six-Day War in 1967, Fara'ata has been held under Israeli occupation. 

After the 1995 accords, 58.3% of the total village land of Immatain/Fara'ata was assigned as Area B land, while the remaining 41.7% is  Area C land.

In 2010, Far'ata was described by Gideon Levy as one of the Palestinian villages where the people "live in terror of the settlers and their accursed 'Price tag,' and nobody came to their defense".

References

Bibliography

External links
Welcome To Far'ata
Survey of Western Palestine, Map 11:     IAA, Wikimedia commons 
 Immatin Village (including Far’ata Locality) (Fact Sheet),   Applied Research Institute–Jerusalem (ARIJ)
 Immatin Village Profile (including Far’ata Locality), ARIJ
 Far’ata, aerial photo, ARIJ
Development Priorities and Needs in Imatin (including Far’ata Locality), ARIJ

Qalqilya Governorate
Villages in the West Bank
Ancient Samaritan settlements